Hoogeveen may refer to:

 Hoogeveen, a large town in Drenthe, the Netherlands
 Hoogeveen, Nootdorp, a former municipality in South Holland, the Netherlands
 Hogeveen or Hoogeveen, a hamlet and former municipality in South Holland, the Netherlands